Rosni Peak is the highest peak of the Bjelić mountain, which is part of the Accursed Mountains range and located on the Montenegrin–Albanian border. It is 2,524 m (8,280 feet) high, making it the third highest mountain peak in Montenegro.

References

External links
 Rosni Vrh (Maja Rosit), SummitPost.org.

Mountains of Albania
Mountains of Montenegro
Accursed Mountains
Albania–Montenegro border